Bhimakrosupalem is a village near Draksharama in East Godavari District.

References 

Villages in East Godavari district